Cameron Harper (born 10 November 2001) is a Scottish footballer who currently plays for Inverness Caledonian Thistle, as a defender.

Career 
Harper impressed Inverness manager John Robertson during a friendly game with Nairn County in August 2017. He made his league debut for Inverness on 13 March 2018 against Dunfermline Athletic as a late replacement for Riccardo Calder, but was himself injured in the 7th minute of play.

He was one of 10 youth players to turn professional with the club in May 2018.

Harper was recalled from his loan following Jamie McCart's departure to St Johnstone, which left the club with few defenders.

International career 
On 25 May 2021, Harper received his first international call up for the Scotland U-21 squad alongside Inverness teammates Robbie Deas, Daniel MacKay and Roddy MacGregor.

References

External links

2001 births
Living people
Association football defenders
Inverness Caledonian Thistle F.C. players
Scottish footballers
Scottish Professional Football League players
Elgin City F.C. players
Scotland under-21 international footballers